Eraclie Sterian (also known as Eracle or Eracli Sterian; November 23, 1872 – 1948) was a Romanian physician, writer, and political activist, known for introducing sexology and sex education in his country. Trained as a pathologist, he established his reputation as a popularizer of conventional and alternative medicine (primarily hydrotherapy), putting out the influential magazine Medicul Poporului. His early work also dealt with life extension practices and warnings about the effects of pollution. Sterian was a marginal ally of the Symbolist movement, to which his uncle Mircea Demetriade belonged; he had a longstanding friendship with poets Alexandru and Pavel Macedonski. He was a publisher of textbooks and literary works, including Demetriade's "Ali's Dream", and author of dramas. His pro-natalist propaganda play, Tout pour l'enfant, performed at the Théâtre Antoine in 1913.

As a doctor and a social critic, Sterian held unconventional views on eugenics, social hygiene, and the social role of sexual experiences. These caused a lasting scandal for their challenging of ancestral taboos—although, overall, Sterian remained a conservative and an avowed Christian, who claimed to have found a cure for compulsive masturbation. His sex manuals, aimed at a young audience, enjoyed success nationwide, and went through several editions in the 1910s. Sterian's interest diversified with time, and he produced essays challenging scientific orthodoxy on topics such as human evolution and Indo-European studies. Also an advocate of Romanian nationalism, he rallied with the Conservative Party, before defecting to the National Liberals in 1914.

A Colonel in the Romanian Land Forces, Sterian was also an expert of typhus, having taken part in the World War I campaign against epidemics, and managing to survive typhus. In old age, at the height of the Great Depression, he focused on defending his status as a property owner in Bucharest, founding an Association of Mortgaged Owners and Debtors. He followed Jean Th. Florescu's schism from the National Liberal Party, afterwards joining the nationwide League Against Usury. Upon the latter's disestablishment, Sterian joined a "Guard for the Defense of Private Property". He was survived by his son, the writer-politician Paul Sterian, and by his daughter in law, painter Margareta Sterian; his granddaughter is actress Raluca Sterian.

Biography

Early activities
Born in the port city of Galați, Eraclie Sterian was the son of Dimitrie and Maria. Both parents were natives of Craiova, and had participated in the Romanian War of Independence: Dimitrie as an officer in combat, Maria as a field nurse. His maternal uncle may have been the pioneering microbiologist Constantin Levaditi; on his paternal side, Eraclie was the nephew of actors Aristide Demetriade and Aristizza Romanescu, and of poet Mircea Demetriade. The Sterians were widely thought of as Jewish, and, more specifically, Eraclie was rumored to have been baptized a Christian from Judaism. The family rejected such claims.

Eraclie left Galați as a child and moved with his family to Craiova, where he would later graduate from Carol I National College, in the same class as mathematician Gheorghe Țițeica. From 1891 to 1897, he took courses at the University of Bucharest medical school, and then was an intern at Brâncovenesc Hospital. As a member of the Medical Students' Society from 1892, he gave lectures on the treatment of gonorrhea and the state of physician–patient privilege. In May 1897, he became a Doctor of Medicine with a thesis on aspergillosis, following up with papers on malaria (1899) and tuberculosis transmission (1902); he also edited for print I. T. Thomescu's courses on pathology and internal medicine, and lectured at the Romanian Atheneum on the prevention of gout. Settling in Bucharest, where he briefly put out the magazine Spitalul ("The Hospital"), Sterian married Alexandrina Gulimănescu, daughter of a florist from Pitești. Together, they had four children, including sons Paul (born 1904) and Constantin. Their home by 1912 was on Bibescu-Vodă Street, 22.

In parallel to his work in conventional medicine, Sterian was becoming a follower of Sebastian Kneipp's water cures. He published his own introduction on the subject, including a biography of Kneipp, in 1904. In 1903, he relaunched his work in medical journalism with a review called Tribuna Sănătăței ("Health Tribune"), and then involved himself in public debates over the medical implications of wearing corsets. By late 1904, he was arguing, against Dimitrie Gerota, that corsets were not harmful in themselves. From November 1, 1905, to May 7, 1911, Sterian put out a weekly magazine, first as Medicina Populară ("Popular Medicine"), then as Medicul Poporului ("People's Physician"). He began writing occasional articles for Familia, including a 1906 piece on life extension, advertising iodine-based cures. By 1905, Sterian and his Demetriade uncle had joined the circle of Symbolist writers and connoisseurs formed around Alexandru Macedonski. Sterian's various opinion pieces were published under pseudonyms: Ester (in Macedonski's Liga Conservatoare), Est, and Ilcare.

Sterian's popularization of health subjects earned him a following among the youth and working-class readers. This is attested by writer Panait Istrati, who grew up reading Medicina Populară. In 1908, Sterian published his best-seller, Educația sexelor ("Sex Education"). It had another edition published that same year, and three more, including a French translation, before 1915. It was complemented by a sex manual, În noaptea nunții ("On Your Wedding Night"), published in two editions in 1909. Popular with the regular public, such works were found unpalatable by Christian critics, who objected in particular to Sterian's claim that sexual refinement was one of "the holy ancestral values". The Greek-Catholic intellectual Teofil A. Bălibanu, who read Educația sexelor in high school, called it "a diabolic work", alleging that "tens of thousands of young men and women" had been driven astray by Sterian. Doctor Ștefan Irimescu dismissed Sterian as a profiteer, noting that the sexology books, rich in "tiny disgusting details", "excite the morbid curiosity of his various readers".

Nevertheless, the books took a conservative view on issues such as masturbation. Sterian believed that recluse male youth were driven into compulsive self-stimulation by "lack of exercise, lack of fresh air, [and by] reading sensual stories and novels", as well as by oxalic acid as found in chocolate. Sterian thought that chronic male masturbators could be recognized by their "pervasive scent of sperm", and also by mannerisms, such as laughing for no apparent reason. He also claimed to have cured thousands of "ephebes" with iodine syrup and injections of cacodylic acid. He used similar treatments for impotence, where he also recommended electroconvulsive therapy.

Eugenics and natalism
His range of interests extended over those years. His topical brochures dealt with life extension treatments, as well as with balneotherapy (at Băile Govora and on the Black Sea Littoral). His proposal that baths could cure tuberculosis was detailed in another 1908 pamphlet, Omul oceanic ("The Oceanic Man"). Also that year, he attended a congress of thalassotherapy in Opatija. First stated in 1909, his claim that he could cure tuberculosis with physiotherapy was met with indignation by the medical establishment. Irimescu, as head physician of Filaret Hospital, called him "illiterate", and suggested that Medicul Poporului was "intoxicating the public" with "repugnant" information. In a March 1910 article for Medicul Poporului, Sterian challenged American eugenicists and their policy of compulsory sterilization, as well as orthodox degeneration theory. In his view, sterilization could provide some form of racial hygiene, but could do nothing to curb crime, mental disease, or alcoholism.

His first involvement in political life, as a Romanian nationalist, came late in 1908, and was occasioned by the Bosnian crisis. Speaking to a nationalist crowd at Dacia Hall, he protested against Austria-Hungary and the Triple Alliance, and even called for the re-annexation of Bukovina by the Kingdom of Romania. A while after, as concerned members of the Romanian Orthodox Church, Sterian and his uncle Mircea Demetriade joined the movement supporting Gherasim Safirin, the Bishop of Roman, in his conflict with the secularizing Romanian Synod. At the time, Sterian publicly referred to the Synod as manipulated by "atheists" and "grave sinners". His wife Alexandrina soon became a major patron of Saint Catherine Church, Bucharest.

Before the elections of 1912, Sterian was also a public speaker at rallies organized by the Conservative Party. To May 15, 1912, he served in the Conservative administration as Comptroller at the Ministry of Commerce. He was co-opted as a medical expert by the Romanian Army bulletin, Buletinul Armatei și Marinei, and also wrote for the nationally circulated weekly Săptămâna Politică și Culturală. Also in 1912, he joined Victor Anestin's Astronomical Society, later becoming inducted into the Société astronomique de France. In 1913, Sterian edited for print the poem "Ali's Dream", by his uncle Demetriade. 

Sterian's own tragicomedy, Tout pour l'enfant ("All for the Child"), was staged in Paris by Théâtre Antoine. Starring Ève Francis and Allain Dhurtal, it registered significant success during the summer 1913 season. If followed the tribulations of a sterile lady, Jeanne Montrose, who encourages her husband to force himself on the much younger Fernande. The conflict over the resulting child is miraculously resolved when Jeanne agrees to let Fernande replace her as Mrs. Montrose. Emery, the staff critic at Comoedia, gave the play a poor review, calling it a "loony bin". Robert de Flers wrote in Le Figaro: "Dr. Eraclie Stérian—apparently well-known in Romania for his scientific works—has set for himself no less a goal than to provide France with a new means to combat depopulation [...]. But heavens, how could Mr. Stérian imagine that in order to produce children for the French—something not at all easy to do—he should first set himself to produce a play—that which is even more difficult? [...] Mr. Eraclie Stérian has an exceedingly large conception of the family, but he also has only a faint notion of what dramatic art is."

With the 1913 book Cum putem mări cantitatea de vieață și Paradoxele longevității ("How Me May Enhance Life Quantitatively, and The Paradoxes of Longevity"), Sterian produced a more radical critique of degeneration theory, proposing a new take on human evolution. He hypothesized that modern man was an ape species that had suffered adaptation to syphilis, which, in his reading, meant increased intelligence. Although he believed that syphilitic infection was a "civilizing hero", Sterian noted that the modern form of the epidemic needed to be kept in check. The book mainly insisted on solutions for the increase of man's lifespan. During the research phase, Sterian offered free consultations to all of Bucharest's centenarians. His overall conclusion was that, through control of one's effort and cultivation of one's intellect, people could live up to age 124.

World War I and after

During early 1914, Sterian renounced his Conservative membership and joined the National Liberal Party, adhering to its Bucharest branch. In summer of that year, which was shortly before the start of World War I, La Presse Médicale published his French-language essay on the supposed medical hazards of asphalt concrete. Sterian argued that, being impossible to sweep clean, asphalt created unhygienic dust, and also warned that asphalt roads had a serious risk of structural collapse. During the following two years, in still-neutral Romania, he returned to his literary work, this time published in Romanian. Tout pour l'enfant was translated as Copilul ("The Child"), and bound together with Sterian's second comedy, O invenție ciudată ("A Strange Invention"). Following Romania's entry into the war, Sterian joined the medical officers' corps of the Second Army, becoming a Major on April 1, 1917, and a Lieutenant Colonel exactly four years later. He earned distinction with his work in combating typhus, contracting the disease himself and publishing his observations in 1918, when other articles of his also saw print in Ionescu-Caion's magazine, Cronicarul. The year also marked his son Paul's debut in literature, at age 14.

Decommissioned and promoted to reserve Colonel on October 1, 1924, Sterian returned to his native city in April 1926 to give a lecture on social medicine and social hygiene—this enterprise was sponsored by the Cultural League for the Unity of All Romanians. Having built himself a townhouse at his old home on Bibescu-Vodă, he joined a protest movement of the Bucharest property-owners against the tax rates. In March 1925, he spoke at its congress, and was mandated to present it grivences to Premier Ion I. C. Brătianu. This movement was consolidated as the Property Owners' Syndicate, founded on December 21, 1925, and presided upon by Constantin Tamara. In parallel, he represented an informal union of medical reservists, who petitioned government to grant them higher ranks and pension rights.

Sterian also made a brief return to politics following the Great Depression, when he founded the activist Association of Mortgaged Owners and Debtors. It was especially active during early 1930, when, together with the larger League Against Usury (LCC), it preached anti-capitalist rebellion at agricultural shows. The authorities kept it under watch, viewing it as an outside associate of the outlawed Romanian Communist Party. By May, Sterian had broken with the National Liberals, whom he depicted as corrupt, and had joined Jean Th. Florescu's political club Omul Liber (or "Liberal-Democratic Party"). Sterian's Association finally merged into the LCC in November 1930. Sterian was a minor candidate in the June 1931 general elections, seconding Florescu on the LCC list for Ilfov County. The national group was dissolved by September 1933, when Sterian was recruited by the Guard for the Defense of Private Property, presided upon by former LCC chairman Eftimie Antonescu.

Sterian later made returns to medical research, and, in 1936, claimed to have cured Pott disease using seawater ("marine plasma") injections. Over those years, Paul Sterian had surpassed his father's renown, becoming one of the leading poets of the Gândirea circle, as well as a noted economist, sociologist, and diplomat. He may have joined the fascist Iron Guard at some point in the early-to-mid 1930s and was alleged to be hosting shooting practice for its members on one of Eraclie's properties. Married to artist Margareta Sterian, Paul was later head of legation in Washington, D. C., then, during World War II, a public servant of the Ion Antonescu regime. The regime adopted hard-line antisemitic policies, and Paul Sterian was tasked with auctioning off confiscated Jewish property. The family again had to dismiss public rumors according to which they were Jewish (though Eraclie's son Constantin would marry a baptized Jew, Silvia Sterian).

At that late stage of his life, Sterian Sr returned to publishing under the pen name Ave Caesar, with Încercări de etimologie ("Essays in Etymology", 1939–1940). Under his real name, he presented his findings to the Friends of Literary History in late November 1940. According to literary historian Victor Durnea, this contribution was forgettable, "obviously the work of a dilettante, often ridiculous in its claims." By late 1941, he was presenting his claim of having deduced "the origin of every word in any Indo-European language"; he also denied the Slavic influence on Romanian, postulating instead that Slavic languages were deeply influenced by Romanian. During 1942, Sterian was active as a member of Pavel Macedonski's Romanian Literary Salon. In early 1944, he returned to publishing with an astronomical tract, denying that the Sun is incandescent, and offering his musings on the possibility of extraterrestrial life. He died in 1948, just as Romania was entering a period of communist rule. The new regime marginalized, imprisoned, and ultimately rehabilitated his writer son, and also briefly arrested Constantin Sterian. The latter's daughter is the actress and model Raluca Sterian, who, during her father and uncle's persecution, protected her career by becoming the lover of communist minister Gogu Rădulescu; in 1964, she managed to emigrate to France, where she married a publisher, Jean-Jacques Nathan.

Notes

References
Lucreția Angheluță, Salomeea Rotaru, Liana Miclescu, Marilena Apostolescu, Marina Vazaca, Bibliografia românească modernă (1831–1918). Vol. IV: R–Z. Bucharest: Editura științifică și enciclopedică, 1996.  
George Baiculescu, Georgeta Răduică, Neonila Onofrei, Publicațiile periodice românești (ziare, gazete, reviste). Vol. II: Catalog alfabetic 1907–1918. Supliment 1790–1906. Bucharest: Editura Academiei, 1969.
Mihail Straje, Dicționar de pseudonime, anonime, anagrame, astronime, criptonime ale scriitorilor și publiciștilor români. Bucharest: Editura Minerva, 1973.  
Cristian Vasile, "Cu ochiul liber. În căutarea amorului nebun: memoriile unei actrițe", in Apostrof, Vol. XXII, Issue 5, 2011, pp. 21–22.

1872 births
1948 deaths
Romanian pathologists
Romanian military doctors
Romanian eugenicists
Romanian sexologists
Hydrotherapists
Hygienists
Natalism
Romanian book publishers (people)
Romanian self-help writers
Romanian biographers
Male biographers
20th-century Romanian male writers
20th-century Romanian dramatists and playwrights
Male dramatists and playwrights
20th-century essayists
Romanian essayists
Male essayists
Romanian columnists
Advice columnists
Romanian magazine founders
Romanian magazine editors
Romanian writers in French
Romanian propagandists
Romanian nationalists
Romanian political candidates
Romanian civil servants
Conservative Party (Romania, 1880–1918) politicians
National Liberal Party (Romania) politicians
People from Galați
Members of the Romanian Orthodox Church
Carol I National College alumni
University of Bucharest alumni
Romanian Land Forces officers
Romanian military personnel of World War I